Sam Querrey was the defending champion, but chose to compete in the Japan Open instead of defending his title.

Wildcard Taylor Harry Fritz won the title defeating Jared Donaldson in the final, 6–4, 3–6, 6–4.

Seeds

Draw

Finals

Top half

Bottom half

References
 Main Draw
 Qualifying Draw

Sacramento Challenger - Singles
Singles